San Millán in Spanish or Donemiliaga in Basque is a scattered municipality made up of several villages located in the province of Araba (Álava), in the Basque Country, northern Spain. Its biggest nucleus is the village San Roman, lying at the south of the important road axis E-5 E-80 N-1 cutting its way east to west through the Alavese Plains. Other localities include Galarreta.

References

External links
 SAN MILLÁN/DONEMILIAGA in the Bernardo Estornés Lasa - Auñamendi Encyclopedia (Euskomedia Fundazioa) 

Municipalities in Álava